IL-11 or IL 11 can refer to:
 Interleukin 11
 Illinois's 11th congressional district
 Illinois Route 11